Huddersfield Town's 1973–74 campaign was a season of new beginnings for Huddersfield Town as they experienced life in the 3rd Division for the first time. The season was not spectacular as Town finished in 10th place, behind fellow West Yorkshire club Halifax Town. At the end of the season, Ian Greaves resigned after 6 years as manager. The alarming slide down the Football League was temporarily halted, but the following season would see Town continue their perilous freefall to the basement of the Football League.

Squad at the start of the season

Review
Following Town's second relegation in 2 seasons, Town had reached a division not seen by any previous Town team in their history. Town would visit 13 grounds for the first time in league football, although 4 of them had hosted Town in cup matches before. Town's start to the season was pretty mediocre with Town drawing 6 of their opening 12 games, losing only 2 of them, but it was a far cry from 1st Division football they were playing just 2 seasons earlier. The previous season's top scorer, Alan Gowling, continued with his goalscoring form scoring 24 goals in the league campaign.

Town eventually finished the season in a disappointing 10th place with 47 points, 2 points behind local rivals Halifax Town. However, at the end of the season Ian Greaves resigned as manager of the side. He became Jimmy Armfield's assistant at Bolton Wanderers. The next season would see Town get even further down the league ladder, so even though Greaves had halted the slide, it was temporary, not permanent.

Squad at the end of the season

Results

Division Three

FA Cup

Football League Cup

Appearances and goals

1973-74
English football clubs 1973–74 season